Hugo Scharnberg (June 28, 1893 – April 30, 1979) was a German politician of the Christian Democratic Union (CDU) and former member of the German Bundestag.

Life 
He had been a member of the German Bundestag since its first election from 1949 to 1961 and represented the electoral district of Hamburg II in the first two legislative periods as a member of parliament elected in 1953 with over 55% of the first votes. In 1957 he entered the Bundestag via the Hamburg state list.

Literature

References

1893 births
1979 deaths
Members of the Bundestag for Hamburg
Members of the Bundestag 1957–1961
Members of the Bundestag 1953–1957
Members of the Bundestag 1949–1953
Members of the Bundestag for the Christian Democratic Union of Germany
Members of the Hamburg Parliament